Clifton Lane is a sports stadium located in Rotherham, South Yorkshire, England. It is the home ground of the professional rugby union team Rotherham Titans who play in the National League 1.

Clifton Lane is also home to the Rotherham Town Cricket Club, known as the 'Builders'.  The club play in the highly regarded ECB Yorkshire League and South Yorkshire League.

References

Bibliography
 Vasili, Phil. The first Black footballer, Arthur Wharton, 1865-1930: an absence of memory. Frank Caas Publishers, 1998.

Rugby union stadiums in England
Sports venues in Rotherham
Defunct football venues in England